McSwain may refer to:

John J. McSwain (1875–1936), U.S. Representative
Rod McSwain (born 1962), American football player
McSwain, California, United States, a census-designated place